The Ljubljana Marathon is a marathon organised in Ljubljana by the City Municipality of Ljubljana (MOL). It has been taking place since 1996 and attracts several thousand people each year.

History 

A total of 673 runners participated in the inaugural event, with 153 runners taking part in the marathon.

In 2020, the 25th Ljubljana Marathon was postponed to 2021 due to the coronavirus pandemic, with all registrants given the option of transferring their entry to 2021 or obtaining a full refund. Nine days before the scheduled date, the Maraton po Ljubljani was cancelled due to the second wave of the pandemic, with all registrants automatically receiving refunds.

Course 

The marathon runs on roughly a loop course that begins on  near the national theatre and ends about a block away in Congress Square.

Runners first run north along Slovenia Street into the Bežigrad District before heading west into the Šiška and Dravlje Districts.  The course then heads south into the Rožnik District, running west of Rožnik Hill, before heading back toward the city centre for the halfway point.

The marathon then briefly heads southwest into the Vič District before heading east through the Trnovo and Rudnik Districts.  Runners then head back northwest to the Ljubljanica river, roughly following the river northeast until they cross .  The course then enters the Jarše District by running northwest along  before the marathoners enter the Bežigrad District again and then head back south to the city centre to finish at Congress Square.

Other races 

In addition to the marathon, a half marathon, a 10K run, a fun run, and a free run for kids are organised.  A number of races of different lengths for schoolchildren of different ages are also held.

Winners 

Key: Course record

Statistics
Note: Marathon statistics only

Multiple wins

Winners by country

Notes

References

External links

Ljubljana Marathon homepage

Marathons in Slovenia
Marathon
Recurring sporting events established in 1996
1996 establishments in Slovenia
Autumn events in Slovenia